The Black Prince-class ships of the line were a class of four 74-gun third rates built for the Royal Navy in the closing years of the Napoleonic War. The draught for this class of ship was essentially a reduced version of the captured Danish ship .

Wellesley later gained the distinction in 1940 of being the only ship of the line to be sunk by air attack.

Hawke was converted to screw propulsion in the 1850s when adapted as a 60-gun "blockship".

Ships

Builder: Bombay Dockyard
Ordered: 6 January 1812
Begun: May 1813
Launched: 24 February 1815
Fate: Sunk in air attack by the Luftwaffe, 1940

Builder: Woolwich Dockyard
Ordered: 14 August 1810
Begun: July 1814
Launched: 30 March 1816
Fate: Broken up, 1855

Builder: Bombay Dockyard
Ordered: 6 September 1813
Begun: July 1815
Launched: 17 February 1817
Fate: Sold, 1873

Builder: Woolwich Dockyard
Ordered: 6 January 1812
Begun: April 1815
Launched: 16 March 1820
Fate: Broken up, 1865

References

Lavery, Brian (2003) The Ship of the Line - Volume 1: The development of the battlefleet 1650–1850. Conway Maritime Press. .
Lyon, David and Winfield, Rif (2004) The Sail and Steam Navy List: All the Ships of the Royal Navy 1815-1889 Chatham Publishing, 2004. .
Winfield, Rif (2008) British Warships in the Age of Sail 1793-1817: Design, Construction, Careers and Fates. 2nd edition, Seaforth Publishing, 2008. .

 
Ship of the line classes
Edward the Black Prince
Ship classes of the Royal Navy